The Journal of Community Health is a peer-reviewed public health journal covering community health which appears every two months. It was established in 1975 as a quarterly journal with Robert L. Kane as the founding editor-in-chief, and the current one is Imperato Pascal (SUNY Downstate Medical Center). According to the Journal Citation Reports, the journal has a 2017 impact factor of 1.530.

References

External links

Bimonthly journals
Public health journals
Publications established in 1975
Springer Science+Business Media academic journals
English-language journals